Those Kids was a British television series which aired in 1956. It was a comedy programme produced by ABC Weekend TV. The series was wiped, and none of the 17 episodes are known to still exist. Little else is known about the series. Cast included Peter Butterworth, Lynn Grant, George Howell and Sandra Walden.

References

External links
Those Kids at IMDb

1956 British television series debuts
1956 British television series endings
1950s British children's television series
Children's comedy television series
Black-and-white British television shows
English-language television shows
Lost television shows
Television shows produced by ABC Weekend TV
1950s British comedy television series